is a Japanese footballer currently playing as a midfielder for Vegalta Sendai.

Career statistics

Club
.

Notes

Personal life 
His elder brother Daichi is also a professional footballer.

References

External links

 
 

2001 births
Living people
Japanese footballers
Association football midfielders
J3 League players
Fukushima United FC players
J2 League players
Vegalta Sendai players